or  is a type of kamaboko, or cured fish surimi produced in Japan. Each cloud-shaped slice of naruto has a pink or red spiral pattern, which is meant to resemble the Naruto whirlpools in the Naruto Strait between Awaji Island and Naruto, Tokushima Prefecture on Shikoku Island in Japan. The word is also used as a slang term for the at sign "@". It is represented by the emoji 🍥.

Production
The city of Yaizu, Shizuoka is known for production of naruto.

Usage 
Naruto is a common topping on Japanese noodles such as Tokyo-style ramen. In some regions of Japan, it is also used as an ingredient of oden and nimono.

See also

References

External links

 Naruto as a topping on soba (Shin-Yokohama Ramen Museum) 
 Knowledge on naruto (Naruto Kitamura Ltd.) 

Japanese cuisine
Surimi
Ramen